Doctor Jazz Records was established by Bob Thiele in 1983 to release new material, historical recordings, and albums previously released on his Flying Dutchman, Signature, Hanover, Amsterdam and Bob Thiele Music labels. Some of these releases had Signature labels. The label ceased to release albums in 1987 and Thiele established Red Baron Records in 1991.

Discography

References

American record labels
Jazz record labels
 
Record labels established in 1983
1983 establishments in the United States
Record labels disestablished in 1987
1987 disestablishments in the United States